The 2003 Tour de la Région Wallonne was the 30th edition of the Tour de Wallonie cycle race and was held on from July to 1 August 2003. The race started in Flobecq and finished in Chaudfontaine. The race was won by Julian Dean.

General classification

References

Tour de Wallonie
Tour de la Région Wallonne